Onchidoris grisea is a species of sea slug, a dorid nudibranch, a shell-less marine gastropod mollusc in the family Onchidorididae.

Distribution
This species was described from Charles River, Chelsea Beach and East Boston Point in Massachusetts on the Atlantic Ocean coast of the United States.

References

Onchidorididae
Gastropods described in 1870